Kara-Buura is a district of Talas Region, in north-western Kyrgyzstan. The administrative seat lies at Kyzyl-Adyr.

Population

Rural communities and villages
In total, Kara-Buura District includes 23 settlements in 10 rural communities. Each rural community can consist of one or several villages. The rural communities and settlements in the Kara-Buura District are:

 Ak-Chiy (seat: Joon-Döbö; incl. Jiyde)
 Amanbaev (seat: Amanbaev; incl. Ak-Jar, Kuru-Maymak and Suulu-Maymak)
 Bakayyr (seat: Ak-Bashat; incl. Kara-Say)
 Bakyyan (seat: Bakyyan; incl. Tamchy-Bulak and Kamash)
 Beysheke (seat: Beysheke; incl. Kara-Buura and Kara-Suu)
 Cholponbay (seat: Chymgent; incl. Kök-Döbö)
 Kara-Buura (seat: Kyzyl-Adyr; incl. Chong-Kara-Buura and Üch-Bulak)
 Kök-Say (seat: Kök-Say; incl. Kaynar)
 Maymak (seat: Maymak)
 Sheker (seat: Sheker; incl. Archagul)

References 

Districts of Talas Region